This is a list of graminoids (grasses, sedges, and rushes) native or introduced to the U.S. state of Minnesota, organized alphabetically by scientific name (genus and species).

A
 Andropogon gerardi (big bluestem; native)
 Andropogon hallii (sand bluestem; introduced from the central United States)
 Agrostis gigantea (black bentgrass; introduced from Eurasia)
 Agrostis hyemalis (winter bentgrass; native)
 Agrostis scabra (rough bentgrass; native)
 Agrostis perennans (upland bentgrass; native)
 Agrostis stolonifera (creeping bentgrass; introduced from Eurasia)

B
 Bouteloua curtipendula (sideoats grama; native)
 Bouteloua dactyloides (buffalograss; native)
 Bouteloua gracilis (blue grama; native)
 Bouteloua hirsuta (hairy grama; native)
 Bromus arvensis (field brome; introduced from Eurasia)
 Bromus catharticus (rescuegrass; introduced from South America)
 Bromus ciliatus (fringed brome; native)
 Bromus inermis (smooth brome; introduced from Eurasia)
 Bromus kalmii (prairie brome, Kalm's brome; native)
 Bromus latiglumis (early-leaved brome; native)
 Bromus pubescens (hairy woodland brome; native)
 Bromus secalinus (rye brome; introduced from Eurasia)
 Bromus tectorum (cheatgrass; introduced from Eurasia)

C
 Calamagrostis canadensis (marsh reedgrass; native)
 Calamagrostis montanensis (plains reedgrass; native)
 Calamagrostis purpurascens (purple reedgrass; native)
 Calamagrostis stricta (slim-stemmed reedgrass; native)
 Calamovilfa longifolia (sand reedgrass; native)
 Carex adusta (lesser brown sedge; native)
 Carex albicans (white-tinged sedge; native)
 Carex albursina (White Bear sedge; native)
 Carex alopecoidea (foxtail sedge; native)
 Carex annectens (yellow-fruited sedge; native)
 Carex aquatilis (water sedge; native)
 Carex arcta (northern cluster sedge; native)
 Carex arctata (drooping woodland sedge; native)
 Carex assiniboinensis (Assiniboia sedge; native)
 Carex atherodes (wheat sedge; native)
 Carex aurea (golden sedge; native)
 Carex bebbii (Bebb's sedge; native)
 Carex bicknellii (Bicknell's sedge; native)
 Carex blanda (common woodland sedge; native)
 Carex brevior (plains oval sedge; native)
 Carex bromoides (brome-like sedge; native)
 Carex brunnescens (brownish sedge; native)
 Carex buxbaumii (Buxbaum's sedge; native)
 Carex canescens (silvery sedge; native)
 Carex capillaris (hair-like sedge; native)
 Carex careyana (Carey's sedge; native)
 Carex castanea (chestnut sedge; native)
 Carex cephaloidea (thin-leaved sedge; native)
 Carex cephalophora (oval-leaved sedge; native)
 Carex chordorrhiza (creeping sedge; native)
 Carex communis (fibrous-rooted sedge; native)
 Carex comosa (long-haired sedge; native)
 Carex conjuncta (soft fox sedge; native)
 Carex conoidea (openfield sedge; native)
 Carex crinita (fringed sedge; native)
 Carex cristatella (crested sedge; native)
 Carex crus-corvi (raven-footed sedge; native)
 Carex cryptolepis (northeastern sedge; native)
 Carex davisii (Davis's sedge; native)
 Carex debilis (white-edged sedge; native)
 Carex deflexa (northern sedge; native)
 Carex deweyana (Dewey sedge; native)
 Carex diandra (lesser panicled sedge; native)
 Carex disperma (soft-leaved sedge; native)
 Carex duriuscula (needle-leaved sedge; native)
 Carex eburnea (ivory sedge; native)
 Carex echinata (star sedge; native)
 Carex echinodes (native)
 Carex emoryi (Emory's sedge; native)
 Carex exilis (coastal sedge; native)
 Carex festucacea (fescue sedge; native)
 Carex filifolia (thread-leaved sedge; native)
 Carex flava (yellow sedge; native)
 Carex foenea (straw sedge; native)
 Carex formosa (handsome sedge; native)
 Carex garberi (elk sedge; native)
 Carex gracillima (graceful sedge; native)
 Carex granularis (limestone meadow sedge; native)
 Carex gravida (heavy sedge; native)
 Carex grayi (common bur sedge, Gray's sedge; native)
 Carex grisea (inflated narrow-leaved sedge; native)
 Carex gynandra (nodding sedge; native)
 Carex gynocrates (northern bog sedge; native)
 Carex hallii (deer sedge; native)
 Carex haydenii (Hayden's sedge; native)
 Carex hirtifolia (pubescent sedge; native)
 Carex hitchcockiana (Hitchcock's sedge; native)
 Carex hookeriana (Hooker's sedge; native)
 Carex houghtoniana (Houghton's sedge; native)
 Carex hystericina (porcupine sedge; native)
 Carex inops (long-stoloned sedge; native)
 Carex interior (inland sedge; native)
 Carex intumescens (greater bladder sedge; native)
 Carex jamesii (James's sedge; native)
 Carex ×knieskernii (native)
 Carex lacustris (lake sedge; native)
 Carex laeviconica (smooth-coned sedge; native)
 Carex laevivaginata (smooth-sheathed sedge; native)
 Carex lasiocarpa (woolly-fruited sedge; native)
 Carex laxiculmis (spreading sedge; native)
 Carex leptalea (bristly-stalked sedge; native)
 Carex leptonervia (nerveless woodland sedge; native)
 Carex limosa (mud sedge; native)
 Carex livida (livid sedge; native)
 Carex lucorum (Blue Ridge sedge; native)
 Carex lupulina (hop sedge; native)
 Carex lurida (shallow sedge; native)
 Carex magellanica (boreal bog sedge; native)
 Carex meadii (Mead's sedge; native)
 Carex merritt-fernaldii (Fernald's sedge; native)
 Carex michauxiana (Michaux's sedge; native)
 Carex molesta (troublesome sedge; native)
 Carex muehlenbergii (Muhlenberg's sedge; native)
 Carex muskingumensis (palm sedge; native)
 Carex normalis (greater straw sedge; native)
 Carex obtusata (obtuse sedge; native)
 Carex oligocarpa (richwoods sedge; native)
 Carex oligosperma (few-seeded sedge; native)
 Carex ormostachya (necklace spike sedge; native)
 Carex pallescens (pale sedge; native)
 Carex pauciflora (few-flowered sedge; native)
 Carex peckii (Peck's sedge; native)
 Carex pedunculata (long-stalked sedge; native)
 Carex pellita (woolly sedge; native)
 Carex pensylvanica (oak sedge, Pennsylvania sedge; native)
 Carex plantaginea (plantain-leaved sedge; native)
 Carex praegracilis (clustered field sedge; native)
 Carex prairea (prairie sedge; native)
 Carex praticola (meadow sedge; native)
 Carex projecta (necklace sedge; native)
 Carex pseudocyperus (cypress-like sedge; native)
 Carex radiata (eastern star sedge; native)
 Carex retrorsa (knot-sheathed sedge; native)
 Carex richardsonii (Richardson's sedge; native)
 Carex rosea (rosy sedge; native)
 Carex rossii (Ross's sedge; native)
 Carex rostrata (beaked sedge; native)
 Carex sartwellii (Sartwell's sedge; native)
 Carex saximontana (Rocky Mountain sedge; native)
 Carex scirpoidea (northern single-spiked sedge; native)
 Carex scoparia (broom sedge; native)
 Carex siccata (dry-spiked sedge; native)
 Carex sparganioides (bur-reed sedge; native)
 Carex squarrosa (squarrose sedge; native)
 Carex sprengelii (long-beaked sedge, Sprengel's sedge; native)
 Carex sterilis (dioecious sedge; native)
 Carex stipata (awl-fruited sedge; native)
 Carex stricta (upright sedge; native)
 Carex suberecta (prairie straw sedge; native)
 Carex supina (weak Arctic sedge; native)
 Carex sychnocephala (many-headed sedge; native)
 Carex tenera (quill sedge; native)
 Carex tetanica (rigid sedge; native)
 Carex tonsa (shaved sedge; native)
 Carex torreyi (Torrey's sedge; native)
 Carex trichocarpa (hairy-fruited sedge; native)
 Carex trisperma (three-seeded sedge; native)
 Carex tuckermanii (Tuckerman's sedge; native)
 Carex typhina (cattail sedge; native)
 Carex umbellata (parasol sedge; native)
 Carex utriculata (Northwest Territory sedge; native)
 Carex vaginata (sheathed sedge; native)
 Carex vesicaria (blister sedge; native)
 Carex viridula (little green sedge; native)
 Carex vulpinoidea (fox sedge; native)
 Carex woodii (pretty sedge; native)
 Carex xerantica (white-scaled sedge; native)
 Cenchrus longispinus (sandbur; native)
 Cinna arundinacea (stout woodreed, sweet woodreed; native)
 Cinna latifolia (drooping woodreed; native)
 Cladium mariscoides (smooth sawgrass; native)
 Cyperus acuminatus (taper-tipped flatsedge; native)
 Cyperus bipartitus (slender flatsedge; native)
 Cyperus diandrus (umbrella flatsedge; native)
 Cyperus erythrorhizos (red-rooted flatsedge; native)
 Cyperus esculentus (yellow nutsedge; native)
 Cyperus fuscus (brown flatsedge; introduced from Eurasia)
 Cyperus houghtonii (Houghton's flatsedge; native)
 Cyperus lupulinus (Great Plains flatsedge; native)
 Cyperus odoratus (fragrant flatsedge; native)
 Cyperus rotundus (nutgrass; native or introduced from Eurasia)
 Cyperus schweinitzii (Schweinitz's flatsedge; native)
 Cyperus squarrosus (bearded flatsedge; native)
 Cyperus strigosus (straw-colored flatsedge; native)

D
 Danthonia spicata (poverty oatgrass; native)
 Dactylis glomerata (orchard grass; introduced from Eurasia)
 Digitaria ischaemum (smooth crabgrass; introduced from Eurasia)
 Digitaria sanguinalis (hairy crabgrass; introduced from Europe)

E
 Elymus canadensis (Canada wild rye; native)
 Elymus hystrix (bottlebrush grass; native)
 Elymus repens (quackgrass; introduced from Eurasia)
 Eragrostis cilianensis (stink grass; introduced from Europe)
 Eragrostis spectabilis (purple lovegrass; native)

H
 Hesperostipa comata (needle-and-thread grass; native)
 Hesperostipa spartea (porcupine grass; native)
 Hordeum jubatum (foxtail barley; native)
 Hordeum pusillum (little barley; native)
 Hordeum vulgare (barley; introduced from Eurasia)

J
 Juncus canadensis (Canada rush; native)
 Juncus tenuis (path rush; native)

K
 Koeleria macrantha (junegrass; native)

L
 Luzula acuminata (hairy woodrush; native)
 Luzula multiflora (common woodrush; native)
 Luzula parviflora (small-flowered woodrush; native)

M
 Muhlenbergia asperifolia (alkali muhly, scratchgrass; native)
 Muhlenbergia cuspidata (plains muhly, prairie satingrass; native)
 Muhlenbergia frondosa (wire-stemmed muhly, common satingrass; native)
 Muhlenbergia glomerata (spiked muhly, marsh muhly; native)
 Muhlenbergia mexicana (Mexican muhly, leafy satingrass, wirestem muhly; native)
 Muhlenbergia racemosa (marsh muhly; native)
 Muhlenbergia richardsonis (mat muhly; native)
 Muhlenbergia schreberi (nimblewill; native)
 Muhlenbergia sylvatica (woodland muhly; native)
 Muhlenbergia uniflora (bog muhly; native)

P
 Panicum capillare (witchgrass; native)
 Panicum dichotomiflorum (fall panicgrass; native)
 Panicum miliaceum (proso millet; introduced from Asia)
 Panicum philadelphicum (Philadelphia panicgrass; native)
 Panicum virgatum (switchgrass; native)
 Paspalum setaceum (thin paspalum; native)
 Phalaris arundinacea (reed canarygrass; native and introduced)

S
 Schizachyrium scoparium (little bluestem; native)
 Sorghastrum nutans (indiangrass; native)
 Spartina pectinata (prairie cordgrass; native)
 Sporobolus compositus (tall dropseed; native)
 Sporobolus cryptandrus (sand dropseed; native)
 Sporobolus heterolepis (prairie dropseed; native)
 Sporobolus neglectus (small dropseed; native)
 Sporobolus vaginiflorus (sheathed dropseed; native)

T
 Triplasis purpurea (sand grass; native)
 Tripsacum dactyloides (gama grass; native)

Z
 Zizania aquatica (wild rice; native)
 Zizania palustris'' (northern wild rice; native)

Graminoids
Minnesota
M